Altoona is an unincorporated community in Coal Township, Jackson County, Ohio, United States. It is located east of Coalton on Ohio State Route 93.

References

Unincorporated communities in Jackson County, Ohio